The Trift Glacier is a  long glacier (2005) in the Urner Alps near Gadmen, in the extreme east of the canton Berne in Switzerland.

Morphology  

In 1973  glacier was 5.75 km long, 3 km wide at the top and around 500 m wide at it tongue.
Overall it covered an area of  including glacier sides. 

Since the end of the Little Ice Age, the  Trift Glacier is shrinking. The valley in which lake Triftsee is today  used to be filled by a large mass of ice  well into the 20th century.  In the 1990s small puddles of melt water began to form at the glacier tongue and gradually became larger. In the hot summer of 2003, the lake quickly grew and the glacier tongue sank into the melt water and dissolved in it, which led to a shrinkage of the glacier of more than 136 m within a year. Since 1861, the glacier has shrunk a total of 2771 meters.

Tourist attractions 
At an altitude of 2520 meters above sea level is the  Trifthutte , a mountain hut of the  Schweizer Alpen-Club (SAC)  that was only accessible via the glacier tongue. Due to the melting of the glacier, in 2004 people were forced to build a bridge, the  Triftbrücke  to reach this hut.

See also
Trift Bridge
Triftsee
List of glaciers in Switzerland
Swiss Alps

References

External links
Swiss glacier monitoring network

Glaciers of the Alps
Glaciers of the canton of Bern
GTrift